National Highway 169A (NH 169A) is a  National Highway in India, which comes under Ministry of Road Transport & Highways, Government of India. The highway starts from Malpe harbour in Udupi and ends at Thirthahalli.its old name was NH 766E.

Though classified as national highway the width of this road is very less at many stretches. The stretches where road width is very less are Malpe to Karavali By-pass , Manipal to Perdoor and Someshwara to Agumbe where only mini buses and mini lorry are allowed. The NH-169A ascends Agumbe ghat section of Western ghats of India (Bharat).

Currently, Malpe to Hebri stretch is being widened to 4-Lane National Highway.

Route 
Thirthahalli - Naalur - Agumbe - Someshwara - Hebri - Shivapura - Perdoor - Hiriyadka - Onthibettu - Athradi - Parkala - Manipal - Kunjibettu - Udupi City - Karavali Junction - Adi Udupi - Kodavoor -  Malpe .

Junctions  

  Terminal near Thirthahalli.
  Terminal near Udupi.

See also 

 List of National Highways in India
 List of National Highways in India by state
 Ghat Roads

References

External links 

 NH 169A on OpenStreetMap

National highways in India
National Highways in Karnataka